The Defense Electronics Supply Center, Columbus (DSCC), is one of three Inventory Control Points of the Defense Logistics Agency. The major organization on base is known as DLA Land and Maritime. Defense Finance and Accounting Service (DFAS) is also a major tenant on base.  The base has been affected several times by the United States Base Realignment and Closure program. It is located in the Columbus, Ohio suburb of Whitehall. The DSCC has a historical marker. The base was opened in 1918.

History

DSCC has served in every major military engagement since World War I. In 1917, the site was a combination of swamp land and farmland. America's production effort in World War I reached a climax in 1918, when transportation lines to ports of embarkation for men and materials were filled to capacity. This site was advantageous because it afforded immediate access to three important railroad lines. The U.S. Army Quartermaster Corps made the first purchase of land, to construct a government military installation in April, 1918. Warehouse construction began in May of that year, and by August, six warehouses were receiving material for storage. Those warehouses are still in use today.

The lull between World War I and World War II reduced center operations to mostly reconditioning and sale of the stockpiles which had been needed earlier to ensure the nations defense.

During World War II the center became the largest military supply installation in the world. In December 1942, an additional  were purchased. With more than 10,000 civilian employees, it played a large part in the overall war effort. Some of the warehouses were turned into secured barracks to house prisoners of war.

Amidst the wars, the conflicts and humanitarian relief efforts, the installation has continuously worked to establish direct and fast moving supply lines to support American armed forces in all parts of the world.

The installation's operational activities were assigned to the U.S. Army Supply and Maintenance Command in July 1962. The following year, it became the Defense Construction Supply Center under what is now known as the Defense Logistics Agency.

DCSC/DESC merger

DSCC was formed from the 1993 Base Realignment and Closure Commission which ordered merger of the former:
Defense Construction Supply Center (DCSC) in Columbus, Ohio
Defense Electronics Supply Center (DESC) in Dayton, Ohio
Decisions made during BRAC 95 further refined the transition toward total weapons systems management.

DSCC was renamed and reorganized in January 1996.

Gallery

External links
 

Buildings and structures in Columbus, Ohio
Military installations in Ohio
Military logistics of the United States
Supply Center, Columbus